Iulian Dumitraş (born 22 June 1982 in Suceava) is a Romanian former rugby union fly-half or fullback. He is the son of former Romania international Hari Dumitraş.

He played for a number of clubs in France including US Dax, Tarbes, FC Grenoble and Section Paloise.

Dumitraş won 45 caps for Romania, since his debut in 2002, with 11 tries, 4 conversions and 2 penalties scored, 69 points in aggregate. He represented his country at the 2007 Rugby World Cup, playing in all the four games.

He and his father are one of only two father/son pairs of rugby players to have both played for their country in the Rugby World Cup.

References

External links
Iulian Dumitraş International Statistics

1982 births
Living people
Romanian rugby union players
Rugby union fly-halves
Rugby union fullbacks
Sportspeople from Suceava
Romania international rugby union players
Romanian expatriate rugby union players
Expatriate rugby union players in France
Romanian expatriate sportspeople in France